Acrocercops selmatica is a moth of the family Gracillariidae. It is known from India (Assam).

References

selmatica
Moths described in 1918
Moths of Asia